The Tourist is an Australian made-for-TV romantic drama film directed by Terry Bourke and starring Tony Bonner, Michael Pate, Chard Hayward, and Zoe Carides.

It was also known as Sands of the Bedouin.

Premise
The film tells the story of an Australian tour guide in Jordan whose two charges are murdered.

Cast
Tony Bonner as John Ramsden
Michael Pate as Chief Ibrahaim
Dagmar Bláhová as Laila Ibrahaim
Chard Hayward as Abu Gassam
Harry Michaels as Anwan

References

External links

Australian television films
1987 television films
1987 films
Special Broadcasting Service original programming
Films directed by Terry Bourke